Diana is an American sitcom that aired on NBC during the 1973–1974 television season that was created by Leonard Stern, which ran from September 10, 1973 to January 7, 1974. The series was filmed in front of a live studio audience at CBS Studio Center in Los Angeles.

Premise
The series starred Diana Rigg in her first American television series, as Diana Smythe, a recently divorced British fashion designer who moves to the States in the hopes of becoming more noticed in the fashion world by relocating to New York City. As the series begins she has landed a high-profile job as a fashion coordinator at Buckley's Department Store. Since her city-dwelling brother is out of the country indefinitely she moves into his apartment, which to her bemusement becomes the site of many unannounced visits by her brother’s numerous girlfriends.

Each episode finds Diana trying to adjust to American life with help from her next door neighbor Holly Green (Carole Androsky), copywriter Howard Tollbrook (Richard B. Shull), window decorator Marshall Tyler (Robert Moore) and new pal Jeff Harmon (Richard Mulligan), while dealing with her boss Norman Brodnik (David Sheiner) and his wife Norma (Barbara Barrie).

Production
Prior to being picked up by NBC, the series had the working title The Diana Rigg Show with Rigg playing Elyse Smythe. Also in the pilot was Nanette Fabray as Norma Brodnik, but after it was changed to Diana, Fabray was replaced with Barrie in the Norma role.

NBC was hoping to capitalize on the success of single and independent women sitcoms by using Rigg, given her credentials in film and TV, with this attempt to copy The Mary Tyler Moore Show. However, it would turn out to be a mistake as it wound up trailing both Gunsmoke and The Rookies on Monday nights, eventually leading to its cancellation on January 7, 1974.

Episode list

External links 
 

1973 American television series debuts
1974 American television series endings
1970s American sitcoms
NBC original programming
Television shows set in New York City
Fashion-themed television series
Television series by Universal Television
English-language television shows
Television series by Talent Associates